Drago Papa (born 9 February 1984) is a Croatian footballer currently playing for NK Vrbovec in the Treća HNL.

Club career
A product of Dinamo Zagreb academy, Papa never managed to break into the first team and he had his professional debut at Croatia Sesvete, where he was on loan in the 2002–03 season. He was released by Dinamo in 2003 and then went on to play for Prva HNL sides Kamen Ingrad and Varteks, Slaven Belupo before joining HNK Gorica in August 2011 on a free transfer. He played his first game for HNK Gorica on 28 August 2011, in a match against NK Vinogradar. He was subbed in the sixty-ninth minute. He made his first assist on 10 October 2011, in a match against NK Pomorac. After failing to impress during first half of season in HNK Gorica, he was released and eventually signed for his hometown club NK Vrbovec. He had a spell with SV Eberau later in his career.

International career
Internationally, Papa played a total of 34 games and scored 2 goals for various Croatia national youth teams. He represented Croatia at the 2001 UEFA European U-16 Championship and the 2001 FIFA U-17 World Championship.

References

External links

1984 births
Living people
People from Vrbovec
Association football midfielders
Croatian footballers
Croatia youth international footballers
Croatia under-21 international footballers
NK Croatia Sesvete players
NK Kamen Ingrad players
NK Varaždin players
NK Slaven Belupo players
HNK Gorica players
NK Vrbovec players
Croatian Football League players
Austrian Landesliga players
Croatian expatriate footballers
Expatriate footballers in Austria
Croatian expatriate sportspeople in Austria